The Etichonids were an important noble family, probably of Frankish, Burgundian or Visigothic origin, who ruled the Duchy of Alsace in the Early Middle Ages (7th–10th centuries). The dynasty is named for Eticho (also known as Aldarich), who ruled from 662 to 690.

The earliest accounts record the family's beginnings in the pagus Attoariensis around Dijon in northern Burgundy. In the mid-7th century a duke of the region named Amalgar and his wife Aquilina are noticed as major founders and patrons of monasteries. King Dagobert I and his father made donations to them to recover their loyalty and compensate them for the losses that they had sustained as supporters of Queen Brunhild and her grandson, Sigebert II. Amalgar and his wife founded a convent at Brégille and an abbey at Bèze, installing a son and daughter in the abbacies. They were succeeded by their third child, Adalrich, who was the father of Adalrich, Duke of Alsace. This second Adalrich was the first to secure the ducal title. His name, Eticho, a variation of Adalrich, is used by modern scholars as the name of the family. 

Under the Etichonids, Alsace was generally divided into a northern and a southern county, Nordgau and Sundgau.
These counties, as well as the monasteries of the duchy, were brought under tighter control of the dukes with the rise of the Etichonids. There exists scholarly debate concerning whether or not the Etichonids were in conflict or alliance with the Carolingians, but it is possible that they were both: opponents of the extension of Charles Martel's authority in the 720s when he first made war on Alemannia, but allies when the Alemanni, under Duke Theudebald invaded Alsace (which had a large Alemannic element in its population) in the early 740s. The last Etichonid duke, Liutfrid, may have died fighting Theudebald on behalf of Pepin the Short with his son, Hilfrid.

Among the descendants of the Etichonids, in the female line were Hugh of Tours and his family, including his daughter Ermengard, who was wife to Lothair I and thus mother to three Carolingian kings. In the 10th century the Etichonids remained powerful in Alsace as counts, but their power was circumscribed significantly by the Ottonians and by the 11th century, Pope Leo IX seemed unaware that his ancestors, the lords (or counts) of Dabo and Eguisheim for the previous half century were in fact the direct descendants of the last Etichonids. Many notable European families trace their lineage to the Etichonids, including the Habsburgs.

Etichonid dukes and counts in Alsace
(Note: Here the numbering of the counts is the same for all states, as all were titled Counts of Alsace, despite of the different parts of land and its particular numbering of the rulers.)

Sources
Hummer, Hans J. Politics and Power in Early Medieval Europe: Alsace and the Frankish Realm 600–1000. Cambridge University Press: 2005. See mainly pp 46–55.

References

 
Alsatian nobility